María Alejandra or Marialejandra is a Hispanic feminine given name that may refer to
María Alejandra Bravo (born 1961), Mexican biochemist 
María Alejandra Guzmán (born 1984), Dominican TV and radio hostess, actress and model
María Alejandra Idrobo (born 1988), Colombian sprinter
Marialejandra Marrero (born 1991), Venezuelan internet personality
Marialejandra Martín (born 1964), Venezuelan actress
María Alejandra Tucat (born 1961), Argentinean field hockey player

See also
MV María Alejandra, a Spanish oil tanker built in 1975 

Spanish feminine given names